Nembo may refer to:

Military
 184th Paratroopers Division "Nembo", a Royal Italian Army unit in World War II
 183rd Paratroopers Regiment "Nembo", a unit of the division, still in existence
 185th Paratroopers Regiment "Nembo", a unit of the division
 Other Italian Army units - see List of units of the Italian Army#Paracadutisti
 , an Italian class of six destroyers built between 1899 and 1905
 , a Nembo-class destroyer launched in 1901 and sunk in 1916
 , a Turbine-class destroyer launched in 1927 and sunk in 1940

Other uses
 Neri and Bonacini, also called Nembo, an Italian shop which produced car bodies for Ferrari, Lamborghini and Maserati
 Val Nembo, a valley in the Bergamasque Prealps Italian mountain range
 Nembo, a variety of Pals Rice
 Nembo (Stormcloud), a 1935 play by Massimo Bontempelli
 Nembo Film, a film production company - see Ettore Fieramosca (1938)

See also
 Antonello Riva (born 1962), Italian former basketball player nicknamed "Nembo Kid"